Brusturoasa is a commune in Bacău County, Western Moldavia, Romania. It is composed of six villages: Brusturoasa, Buruieniș, Buruienișu de Sus, Camenca, Cuchiniș and Hângănești.

References

Communes in Bacău County
Localities in Western Moldavia